Eldorado Park is a suburb of Soweto, Johannesburg, South Africa. It is located in Region G of the City of Johannesburg Metropolitan Municipality. It lies on the southern boundary of Soweto and  prior to 1994, was a Coloured township during Apartheid.

History
In 1965, the land was declared an area for the exclusive settlement of the Coloured South Africans under the Group Areas Act. It became part of Johannesburg in 1970. On 26 August 2020, local resident Nathaniel Julies was fatally shot by members of the South African Police Service.

Notable people
 Liesl Laurie - Miss South Africa 2015
 Liesl Penniken - singer, most famously as a member of Jamali (band)

References

Johannesburg Region G
Soweto Townships